Aleksandar Zečević may refer to:

 Aleksandar Zečević (basketball, born 1975), Serbian basketball coach and former player
 Aleksandar Zečević (basketball, born 1996), Serbian player